Munditia aupouria is a minute sea snail, a marine gastropod mollusc in the family Liotiidae.

Description
The height of the shell attains 1.7 mm, its diameter 3.5 mm.

Distribution
It is an endemic marine species, known only from Three Kings Islands, New Zealand.

References

 Powell A. W. B., New Zealand Mollusca, William Collins Publishers Ltd, Auckland, New Zealand 1979

External links
 A.W.B. Powell, The Molluscan Fauna of Northern New Zealand; Discovery Reports v. 15, p. 181,1937

aupouria
Gastropods of New Zealand
Gastropods described in 1937